Choden is a Tibetan and Bhutanese name that may refer to
Phuntsho Choden (1911–2003), late Queen Grandmother of Bhutan 
Kesang Choden (born 1930), Queen Grandmother of Bhutan
Sangay Choden (born 1963), Queen Mother of Bhutan
Kesang Choden (born 1982), Princess of Bhutan
Euphelma Choden (born 1993),  Princess of Bhutan 
Dorji Choden (born 1960), Bhutanese politician 
Khendum Choden, Bhutanese poet and author
Kunzang Choden (born 1952), Bhutanese writer
Kunzang Choden (born 1984), Bhutanese sports shooter 
Kyabje Choden Rinpoche (1931–2015), Tibetan Buddhist Meditation Master and Scholar
Tshering Choden (born 1979), Bhutanese archer
Tashi Choden (born 1998 or 1999), Bhutanese-Tibetan pageant titleholder

See also
Choden F.C., a football club in Bhutan

Thinley Norbu ( English: Jewel of Activity) was the oldest son.
Dzongkha-language surnames
Surnames of Bhutanese origin